The cuneiform ù sign ('u, no. 3'), is found in both the 14th century BC Amarna letters and the Epic of Gilgamesh. Its use is as a conjunction, (translated as for example: and, but, else, until, etc.), but rarely it is substituted for alphabetic u, but that vowel u is typically represented by 'u, no. 2', (u prime), ú; occasionally 'u, no. 1', (u (cuneiform)), (mostly used for a conjunction, and numeral 10), is also substituted for the "alphabetic u".

The use of ù is often as a "stand-alone" conjunction, for example between two listed items, but it is used especially as a segue in text, (example Amarna letters), when changing topics, or when inserting segue-pausing positions. In the Amarna letters, it is also commonly immediately followed by a preposition: a-na, or i-na, used as "...And, to....", or "...And, in...."; also "...But, for....", etc. This usage with a preposition is also a better example of the segue usage.

Of the three u's, by graphemic analysis (Buccellati, 1979), the commonness is as follows:

ù (cuneiform), conjunction only (but also rare, for alphabetic "u")
ú (cuneiform), alphabetic 'u'
u (cuneiform), alphabetic (minor), 10, conjunction (highest use)

Both "ù (cuneiform)" and ú are in the top 25 most used signs, but E (cuneiform) and "u (cuneiform)" are not; other vowels (or combination) in the 25 are: a (cuneiform), i (cuneiform), and ia (cuneiform), (ia which has a secondary use as suffix, "-mine", or "my", thus in top 25 most used signs). Suffix "iYa" is used in the Middle East\Southwest Asia at present day to end placenames, or other names: "My Xxxxx".

Usage numbers of ù in the Epic of Gilgamesh is as follows: ù-(84); Buccellati's usage numbers (330 Amarna letters) is (1848).

Amarna letter varieties

Scribal variants of ù exist, and especially in the Amarna letters. At least one Amarna letter, EA 367, (Pharaoh to Endaruta), has an atypical variant, but the entire letter has somewhat unusual cuneiform signs. (gáb(káp)-(4 uses), tá, and a variant form of um) ("um" also =ṭup, also in the letter, for "clay tablet"-(tuppu), etc.)

 Cuneiform-Ù--(EA 367-scribe variant)----(plus added-, covering up the (2)-3 horizontals, (and one added horizontal), as a complete replacement, instead of the horizontals!). The resultant is: wedge+Vertical+wedge+Vertical! (takes up same amount of clay tablet line-space)

Partial list of signs beginning with wedge (u)
Partial list of signs beginning with u-(wedge), from the Epic of Gilgamesh (Parpola, 1971), and the Amarna letters:

 Cuneiform-u--Sign No. 1----(conjunction use, and "10"; occasionally for u)
 Cuneiform-AMAR, ṣur, zur--Sign No. 2---; Sumerogram: See!-(AMAR) (Akkadian language, "amāru", to see, behold)-(Note: minus the vertical stroke)
 Cuneiform-di--Sign No. 3---
 Cuneiform-ki--Sign No. 4---
 Cuneiform-mi-(Sign 5)
 Cuneiform-ši--Sign No. 6---
 Cuneiform-ši, lim, or IGI ("in 'face' of", "before" Sumerogram)--Sign No. 6-----(Abdi-Ashirta), Abdi-A-Ši-iR-Ta, (wedge-sign, 4th sign)
 Cuneiform-u--Sign No. u-1---
 Cuneiform-ú--Sign No. u-2----(approximate: only 3 verticals for ú, (the common alphabetic u))
 Cuneiform-ù-(u-3)--Sign No. 7---
 (With an added horizontal, after the left vertical)

Also:

 Cuneiform-ar, (Shuwardata of Amarna letter EA 282)
 Cuneiform-ar--..(=ši + ri)
 Cuneiform-nim-(nem, nim, num, and Sumerograms NIM, NUM) (EA 34)

References

Buccellati, Giorgio, (Ugarit-Forschungen 11, 1979). Comparative Graphemic Analysis of Old Babylonian and Western Akkadian, pp. 95–100.
Moran, William L. 1987, 1992. The Amarna Letters. Johns Hopkins University Press, 1987, 1992. 393 pages.(softcover)
 Parpola, 1971. The Standard Babylonian Epic of Gilgamesh, Parpola, Simo, Neo-Assyrian Text Corpus Project, c 1997, Tablet I thru Tablet XII, Index of Names, Sign List, and Glossary-(pp. 119–145), 165 pages.
Ugarit Forschungen (Neukirchen-Vluyn). UF-11 (1979) honors Claude Schaeffer, with about 100 articles in 900 pages. pp 95, ff, "Comparative Graphemic Analysis of Old Babylonian and Western Akkadian", author Giorgio Buccellati, ( i.e. Ugarit and Amarna (letters), three others, Mari, OB,Royal, OB,non-Royal letters).

Cuneiform signs